Bangladesh, with a sea border facing the Bay of Bengal, claims to have the world's longest sea beach, a sea beach with a view of sunrise and sunset and a unique coral sea beach.  Here is a list of sea beaches located in Bangladesh.

Sea beaches in Chittagong Division

Chittagong District
 Patenga sea beach
 Guliakhali Beach
 Parki Beach

Cox's Bazar District
 Cox's Bazar Beach
 Inani Beach
 St. Martin's Island
 Teknaf Beach
 Sonadia Beach

Chandpur District
 Mini Cox's Bazar

Noakhali District
 Nijhum Dip

Sea beaches in Khulna Division

Khulna District
 Kotka Beach

Satkhira District
 Mandarbaria Beach

Sea beaches in Barisal Division

Bhola District
 Tarua Beach

Patuakhali District
 Kuakata Beach

See also
List of beaches

References

Beaches
 
Bangladesh
Beaches